Svinjare or Frashër in Albanian is a village in northern Kosovo, near Vučitrn. It is a Serb enclave.

During the March 2004 unrest in Kosovo the village was razed by Kosovo Albanians and the village became a ghost town.

Notes

References

Serbian enclaves in Kosovo